Eagle Street Pier ferry wharf is located on the northern side of the Brisbane River serving the Brisbane central business district in Queensland, Australia. It was served by Transdev Brisbane Ferries' CityHopper service and a cross-river service to Kangaroo Point (to the Holman Street and Thornton Street ferry terminals).These services were suspended in July 2020 and formally cancelled to stop at this wharf in October 2020.

History 
The wharf sustained moderate damage during the January 2011 Brisbane floods. It reopened after repairs on 14 February 2011.

References

External links

Ferry wharves in Brisbane
Brisbane central business district